The 1963 Norwegian Football Cup was the 58th season of the Norwegian annual knockout football tournament. Also that was the first all-Norwegian cup, as it was the first year clubs from Northern Norway were allowed to participate in the cup. Of the two northern Norwegian teams that participated this year, Bodø/Glimt made it all the way to the fourth round. 

The surprise team of the cup this year was Sagene, a team that made it to the quarter final, despite playing in the third division (tier three).

Skeid won the cup, beating Fredrikstad 2-1 in the final.

Third round

|colspan="3" style="background-color:#97DEFF"|11 August 1963

|-
|colspan="3" style="background-color:#97DEFF"|Replay: 21 August 1963

|}

Fourth round

|colspan="3" style="background-color:#97DEFF"|1 September 1963

|-
|colspan="3" style="background-color:#97DEFF"|Replay: 11 September 1963

|}

Bracket

Quarter-finals

|colspan="3" style="background-color:#97DEFF"|25 September 1963

|-
|colspan="3" style="background-color:#97DEFF"|29 September 1963

|-
|colspan="3" style="background-color:#97DEFF"|Replay: 2 October 1963

|-
|colspan="3" style="background-color:#97DEFF"|2nd replay: 9 October 1963

|}

Semi-finals

|colspan="3" style="background-color:#97DEFF"|20 October 1963

|}

Final

See also
1963 Norwegian First Division

References
http://www.rsssf.no

Norwegian Football Cup seasons
Norway
Football Cup